Dryadaula are a genus of moths belonging to the family Tineidae.
 It was described by Edward Meyrick in 1893, and it belongs to the subfamily or family Dryadaulidae, according to most recent taxonomies.

Species
Dryadaula acrodisca (Meyrick, 1917)
Dryadaula advena (Zimmerman, 1978)
Dryadaula amentata (Meyrick, 1919)
Dryadaula anthracorma Meyrick, 1915
Dryadaula auriformis Yang & Li, 2021
Dryadaula boviceps (Walsingham, 1914)
Dryadaula bronctotypa (Meyrick, 1880)
Dryadaula castanea Philpott, 1915
Dryadaula catorthota (Meyrick, 1917)
Dryadaula caucasica (Zagulajev, 1970)
Dryadaula discatella (Walker, 1864)
Dryadaula epischista (Meyrick, 1936)
Dryadaula epixantha (Turner, 1923)
Dryadaula flavostriata Yang & Li, 2021
Dryadaula germana (Walsingham, 1914)
Dryadaula glycinocoma (Meyrick, 1932)
Dryadaula glycinopa Meyrick, 1893
Dryadaula heindeli Gaedike & Scholz, 1998
Dryadaula hellenica (Gaedike, 1988)
Dryadaula hirtiglobosa Yang & Li, 2021
Dryadaula irinae (Savenkov, 1989)
Dryadaula isodisca (Meyrick, 1917)
 Dryadaula koreana Roh & Byun, 2020
Dryadaula marmoreipennis (Walsingham, 1897)
Dryadaula melanorma (Meyrick, 1893)
Dryadaula mesosticha (Turner, 1923)
Dryadaula metrodoxa (Meyrick, 1919)
Dryadaula minuta Gaedike, 2007
Dryadaula multifurcata Gaedike, 2000
Dryadaula murenula (Meyrick, 1924)
Dryadaula myrrhina Meyrick, 1905
Dryadaula napaea Meyrick, 1905
Dryadaula nedae (Gaedike, 1983)
Dryadaula pactolia Meyrick, 1901
Dryadaula panscia (Meyrick, 1917)
Dryadaula placens (Meyrick, 1920)
Dryadaula poecilta (Walsingham, 1914)
Dryadaula rhombifera (Meyrick, 1917)
Dryadaula securiformis Yang & Li, 2021
Dryadaula selenophanes (Meyrick, 1880)
Dryadaula sublimis (Meyrick, 1917)
Dryadaula terpsichorella (Busck, 1910)
Dryadaula trapezoides (Meyrick, 1935)
Dryadaula tripudians (Meyrick, 1924)
Dryadaula ussurica Gaedike, 2000
Dryadaula visaliella (V.T. Chambers, 1873)
Dryadaula zinica (Zagulajev, 1970)
Dryadaula zygodes (Meyrick, 1918)
Dryadaula zygoterma (Meyrick, 1917)

References

Dryadaulinae
Taxa named by Edward Meyrick